The Brønnøysund Bridge is a cantilevered road bridge near the town of Brønnøysund in Brønnøy municipality in Nordland county, Norway. The bridge was constructed in 1979 and it connects the small island of Torget with the mainland just south of Brønnøysund. The bridge deck is made of pre-stressed concrete.

The island of Torget is well known for the mountain Torghatten, which has a hole, or natural tunnel, straight through it.

See also
List of bridges in Norway
List of bridges in Norway by length

References

External links
A picture of the Brønnøysund Bridge
Another picture of the bridge
 

Road bridges in Nordland
Brønnøy
1979 establishments in Norway
Bridges completed in 1979